Gramella oceani is a Gram-negative, strictly aerobic, non-endospore-forming and rod-shaped bacterium from the genus of Gramella which has been isolated from marine sediments from the coast from Kending in Taiwan. Gramella oceani produces zeaxanthin.

References

Flavobacteria
Bacteria described in 2014